Ezekiel Joe Bassey  (born 10 November 1996) is a Nigerian footballer who plays as a winger for Nigerian Club Akwa United.He is a pacey winger, known for his good dribbling ability and very high work rate.

Club career

Early career
Born in Akwa Ibom, Bassey started his career with Akwa Starlet.

Akwa United
Bassey signed with Akwa United for the 2013-2014 season.

Enyimba
Recruited by Enyimba's team of scouts at the start of the 2014-2015 season, Bassey already had a reputation as one of the league's rising stars. He finished his first season for the club with 3 goals and over 10 assists in the league to drive Enyimba to their seventh title.

Barcelona B (loan)
Following the NPFL All-Star tour of La Liga in 2016, he was scouted by Barcelona and subsequently secured a loan to the B team from his home club of Enyimba FC. Ezekiel Bassey joined Barcelona B on transfer deadline day, 31 January 2017. His deal has the option of being made permanent at the end of the loan.

Paykan
On 20 September 2017, Bassey signed a contract with Paykan. He made three league appearances at the club.

Akwa United
Bassey rejoined Akwa United on a year deal in 2018 after a short spell with Paykan.

Al Masry SC
On 21 January 2019, it was announced that Bassey had joined Egyptian club Al Masry SC on a three-year deal.

Petrojet SC
With just few months of joining Al Masry SC, Bassey drew the attention of some clubs and he received a lot of offers but he opted to joined Egyptian club Petrojet SC on a year deal in July 2019.

International career
He made his debut for the full Nigeria national team on 17 November 2015 in the CAF World Cup Qualifier against Swaziland. He would also play in the African Nations Championship against Tunisia in January 2016.

Honours

Club
Enyimba International F.C.
Nigerian Premier League: Winner 2015
Enyimba International F.C.
Nigerian FA Cup: Winner 2014

Individual
Enyimba International F.C.
Player of the Season Award (1): 2013-2014

References

External links
Ezekiel Bassey at Footballdatabase

1996 births
Living people
Nigerian footballers
Nigeria Professional Football League players
Association football wingers
Segunda División B players
Persian Gulf Pro League players
Egyptian Premier League players
Al Masry SC players
Petrojet SC players
Paykan F.C. players
FC Barcelona Atlètic players
Enyimba F.C. players
Akwa United F.C. players
Nigeria international footballers
Nigeria A' international footballers
2016 African Nations Championship players
Nigerian expatriate sportspeople in Iran
Nigerian expatriate sportspeople in Spain
Nigerian expatriate sportspeople in Egypt
Expatriate footballers in Spain
Expatriate footballers in Iran
Expatriate footballers in Egypt